Haukur Angantýsson (2 December 1948 – 4 May 2012) was an Icelandic chess International Master.

He was awarded the International Master title by FIDE in 1981.

Haukur won the Icelandic Chess Championship in 1976.

His greatest success was his victory in the 1979 World Open at Philadelphia with 8 points out of 10 games, after a tie-break with six other players, four of whom were grandmasters: Tony Miles, Florin Gheorghiu, Walter Browne, Arthur Bisguier, Bernard Zuckerman and John Fedorowicz.

References

External links
 Haukur Angantysson rating card at FIDE 
 

1948 births
2012 deaths
Haukur Angantysson
Haukur Angantysson